Nayef Rajoub (born 1958) was the Religious Affairs Minister of Palestine in the Hamas-led Palestinian Authority cabinet and beekeeper. He has been arrested five times by Israel and once by his brother Jibril Rajoub in 1996 during a crackdown on Hamas members by Preventive Security Force led by Jibril. Nayef, however, was released after only a day. Nayef and his brother parted politically years ago; Jibril is a member of the rival Fatah party and ran against Nayef in the 2006 Palestinian legislative elections. Nayef Rajoub was arrested by Israel on June 29, 2006 as part of Israel's Operation Summer Rains.

On 26 July 2020, IDF arrested Rajoub from his home in the city of Dura near Hebron.

References

Hamas members
1958 births
Living people
Government ministers of the Palestinian National Authority
People from Dura, Hebron
University of Jordan alumni
Hebron University alumni
Members of the 2006 Palestinian Legislative Council
Academic staff of Al-Quds Open University